Buttrose is a surname. Notable people with the surname include:

Ita Buttrose (born 1942), Australian journalist and businesswoman
Larry Buttrose (born 1952), Australian writer, journalist, and academic
Stroma Buttrose (born 1929), Australian architect

See also
 Butters (surname)